The Central District of Rafsanjan County is a district (bakhsh) in Rafsanjan County, Kerman Province, Iran. At the 2006 census, its population was 211,495, in 52,055 families.  The district has two cities: Rafsanjan and Mes-e Sarcheshmeh. The district has eight rural districts (dehestan): Azadegan Rural District, Darreh Doran Rural District, Eslamiyeh Rural District, Kabutar Khan Rural District, Khenaman Rural District, Qasemabad Rural District, Razmavaran Rural District,  and Sarcheshmeh Rural District.

References 

Rafsanjan County
Districts of Kerman Province